The medial longitudinal fasciculus (MLF) is an area of crossed over tracts, on each side of the brainstem. These bundles of axons are situated near the midline of the brainstem. They are made up of both ascending and descending fibers that arise from a number of sources and terminate in different areas, including the superior colliculus, the vestibular nuclei, and the cerebellum. It contains the interstitial nucleus of Cajal, responsible for oculomotor control, head posture, and vertical eye movement.

The medial longitudinal fasciculus is the main central connection for the oculomotor nerve, trochlear nerve, and abducens nerve. It carries information about the direction that the eyes should move. Lesions of the medial longitudinal fasciculus can cause nystagmus and diplopia, which may be associated with multiple sclerosis, a neoplasm, or a stroke.

Structure 
The medial longitudinal fasciculus is an area of crossed over tracts, on each side of the brainstem. It is medial, and close to the periaqueductal gray matter around the cerebral aqueduct. It is found between the spinal cord (caudally) and the pretectum (cranially). It connects with the superior colliculus, the vestibular nuclei, and the cerebellum. It contains the interstitial nucleus of Cajal. The medial longitudinal fasciculus also contains the rostral interstitial nucleus (riMLF), which is the vertical gaze center. 

Descending fibers arise from the superior colliculus in the rostral midbrain (for visual reflexes), the accessory oculomotor nuclei in the rostral midbrain for visual tracking, and the pontine reticular formation, which facilitates extensor muscle tone. Ascending tracts arise from the vestibular nucleus and terminate in the oculomotor nucleus (of the oculomotor nerve, CN III), the trochlear nucleus (of the trochlear nerve, CN IV), and the abducens nucleus (of the abducens nerve, CN VI). These three nuclei lie alongside the medial longitudinal fasciculus.

Function 
The medial longitudinal fasciculus carries information about the direction that the eyes should move. It connects the nuclei of the oculomotor nerve (CN III), the trochlear nerve (CN IV), and the abducens nerve (CN VI). It integrates movements directed by the gaze centers (frontal eye field) and information about head movement (from the vestibulocochlear nerve, CN VIII). It is an integral component of saccadic eye movements, as well as vestibulo–ocular reflex, and the optokinetic reflex.

It also carries the descending tectospinal tract and medial vestibulospinal tracts into the cervical spinal cord, and innervates some muscles of the neck and upper limbs.

Vestibulo-ocular reflex 
The medial longitudinal fasciculus is involved in the generation of the vestibulo–ocular reflex. This is achieved by inputs to the vestibular nucleus from:
 the vestibulocochlear nerve (CN VIII). This is related to head movements.
 the flocculus of the cerebellum. This is related to gait adjustments.
 head and neck proprioceptors and foot and ankle muscle spindle, via the fastigial nucleus. This is related to position.

Clinical significance 
A lesion of the medial longitudinal fasciculus produces slowed or absent adduction of the ipsilateral eye upon contralateral gaze. This is usually associated with involuntary jerky eye movements (nystagmus) of the abducting eye, a syndrome called internuclear ophthalmoplegia. Because multiple sclerosis causes demyelination of the axons of the central nervous system, it can cause internuclear ophthalmoplegia when medial longitudinal fasciculus axons get demyelinated. This presents as nystagmus and diplopia. Other demyelinating diseases, as well as certain neoplasms and strokes, can also cause the same symptoms.

History 
In 1846, neurologist Benedict Stilling first referred to the medial longitudinal fasciculus as the acusticus. This was followed by Theodor Meynert in 1872 calling it posterior. In 1891, Heinrich Schutz chose the name dorsal to describe the longitudinal bundle. This name stuck despite other authors attempting further renaming (Ramon y Cajal's periependymal in 1904, Theodor Ziehen's nubecula dorsalis in 1913). Finally, Wilhelm His Sr. changed the name to medial to comply with Basle nomenclature.

Additional images

See also 
 Listing's law

References

External links 
  - "Brainstem, Cranial Nerve Nuclei, Sagittal Section, Medial View"
 https://web.archive.org/web/20091021004541/http://isc.temple.edu/neuroanatomy/lab/atlas/papc/

Brainstem
Central nervous system pathways